Victorian State League Division 5 is the eighth level of soccer in Victoria, Australia, and the ninth nationally. The league is split into four geographic conferences - North, West, South and East. The league replaced Provisional League 3 and the Metropolitan League in 2013 following a restructure of the Victorian State League.

The winners of each conference are promoted to Victorian State League Division 4. As the lowest tier in Victorian football system, there is no relegation from the league, however clubs may apply to join.

Member clubs 2023
The following 46 clubs from two conferences of 11 and two conferences of 12 will be competing in the Victorian State League Division 5 during the 2023 season.

State League Division 5 North

State League Division 5 West

State League Division 5 South

State League Division 5 East

Honours list

External links
 Football Federation Victoria Website

5